Pilar Sánchez Cervi (born 6 January 1982) is a Spanish field hockey player who competed in the 2008 Summer Olympics.

References

External links
 

1982 births
Living people
Spanish female field hockey players
Olympic field hockey players of Spain
Field hockey players at the 2008 Summer Olympics